Major Edward Bruce Alexander   (3 March 1872 – 21 March 1955) was a British civil servant in Ceylon. He served as acting Governor of British Ceylon from October to November 1925.

Biography

Alexander was born in India, where his father, Richard Dundas Alexander, was a member of the Indian Civil Service. Alexander was educated in England, attending Forest School and Trinity College, Oxford. He was a cricketer, playing for the Authentics and the Corinthians. He joined the Ceylon Civil Service at a young age, and continued to play cricket in Ceylon.

During the First World War, he served in France, reaching the rank of major, and was an original member of Toc H.

Alexander returned to Ceylon after the war, and was appointed Controller of Revenue in Ceylon in 1922. He was acting Colonial Secretary from 1925 to 1927, and was acting Governor from 18 October 1925 to 30 November 1925. He was succeeded by Hugh Clifford.

Alexander was appointed a Companion of the Order of St Michael and St George in the 1925 Birthday Honours. He retired in 1927 and returned to England.

In 1899, he married Mabel Eleanor (née Bosanquet). They had two sons and a daughter.

References

1872 births
1955 deaths
Governors of British Ceylon
Companions of the Order of St Michael and St George
People from Mainpuri
Alumni of Trinity College, Oxford
People educated at Forest School, Walthamstow
Members of the Legislative Council of Ceylon